Wycliffe is a British television series, based on W. J. Burley's novels about Detective Superintendent Charles Wycliffe. It was produced by HTV and broadcast on the ITV Network, following a pilot episode on 7 August 1993, between 24 July 1994 and 5 July 1998. The series was filmed in Cornwall, with a production office in Truro. Music for the series was composed by Nigel Hess, who was nominated for the Royal Television Society award for the best original television theme in 1997. Charles Wycliffe is played by Jack Shepherd, assisted by DI Doug Kersey (Jimmy Yuill) and DI Lucy Lane (Helen Masters).

Each episode deals with a murder investigation. In the early series, the stories are adapted from Burley's books and are in classic whodunit style, often with quirky characters and plot elements. In later seasons, the tone becomes more naturalistic and there is more emphasis on internal politics within the police.

Setting and characters
The setting in Cornwall is an important feature of the series, providing both picturesque landscapes and glimpses into the local way of life. Some characters work in the tourist industry. Some of the problems of the county, such as the struggling fishing industry, long-term unemployment, and prejudice against new age travellers, are shown in various episodes. Wycliffe and his team are responsible for a large geographical area and often have to spend time away from home during an investigation. This can cause problems for Wycliffe, who is shown as a contented family man married to a teacher (Lynn Farleigh) and with two teenage children. It also makes it difficult for Lane and Kersey, who are both single, to form relationships outside work.

Wycliffe's beat appears to cover mainly central and west Cornwall. There are frequent references to certain major towns, including Truro, Newquay, Camborne and Penzance (these places were also used as locations). Other towns in the same area, such as Falmouth, St Austell or St Ives, figure less frequently, although Falmouth probably provided some of the backgrounds to scenes in "Time Out", the only episode for which a fictional Cornish town ("Carrick") was invented, complete with a red-light district, called Eastgate. Bodmin (actually mainly Bodmin Moor) features strongly in one episode, "Number of the Beast", which is about the so-called Beast of Bodmin (said to be a big cat). In the final episode, "Land's End", Wycliffe refers to Wadebridge, near Bodmin, as being on "the other side of the county".

Devon and Cornwall Police is no longer organised into divisions. The Major Crime Investigation Team in Cornwall, which would presumably be headed by Wycliffe, was actually based at Newquay during the period in which the series was made, but Wycliffe's divisional headquarters appears to be in the Camborne area.

Green Pea Boat episode ( S1 EP6 ) final scenes: red XJS going over the cliff west of Chapel Porth: National Trust Wheal Charlotte , Towan Cross , Cornwall.

Murder investigations and police themes

The police force in the series is based on the Devon and Cornwall Police, but is called the South West Constabulary.

The series shows detective and forensic work in a reasonably accurate way, but the emphasis is more on the human stories surrounding the murders. Wycliffe is a quiet, thoughtful man, a skilled observer of people and an astute interviewer, and these qualities enable him to solve the crimes.

Internal police politics provide slow-burning story arcs in the later series. Wycliffe constantly has to deal with red tape, budget restraints and a blustering, image-obsessed Deputy Chief Constable. Lane is offered promotion, though she later realises that she is being used to fulfil sexual equality quotas in the force rather than being judged on her ability. There are tensions between her and Kersey, though they have previously been close. Kersey is the subject of an internal investigation and is forced to reconsider his career after being accused of causing the death of a prisoner in custody.

Wycliffe's frequent meetings with the Deputy Chief Constable, Stevens, are slightly odd. In real life there would almost certainly be a Detective Chief Superintendent as the head of CID throughout the force, who would report to one of a series of Assistant Chief Constables, each with a particular responsibility such as operations or personnel. The Deputy Chief Constable is normally too senior to be troubled with operational details unless a major crisis occurs. It is also strange that Stevens is so often on hand and even appears to have an office in the Divisional HQ. Such a postholder would really be based at the police service's headquarters.

Cast
Jack Shepherd as Detective Superintendent Charles Wycliffe
Kevin Quarmby (pilot) and Jimmy Yuill (series) as DI Doug Kersey
Carla Mendonça (pilot) and Helen Masters (series) as DI Lucy Lane
Lucy Fleming (pilot) and Lynn Farleigh (series) as Helen Wycliffe
Peter Settelen (pilot) and Tim Wylton (series) as Dr. Franks
Aaron Harris as DS Dixon (Series 1–3)
Adam Barker as DC Potter (Series 1–3)
Michael Attwell as DCC Stevens (series 4–5)

List of episodes

Wycliffe ran for five series from 24 July 1994 to 5 July 1998, and included a pilot episode (originally shown on 7 August 1993) and a Christmas special shown between the fourth and fifth series.

Notes:
† includes the pilot episode originally aired on 7 August 1993.
‡ includes the Christmas special originally aired on 27 December 1997.

Series 1 (1993-94)

The first series of Wycliffe was originally aired on the ITV network in the summer of 1994.

The pilot episode was originally aired one year earlier than the commissioned first series, in the summer of 1993. The cast of the pilot differs from that used for the commissioned series; Jack Shepherd plays Wycliffe both in the pilot and in the commissioned series.

Series 2 (1995)

The second series of Wycliffe was originally aired on the ITV network in the summer of 1995.

Series 3 (1996)

The third series of Wycliffe was originally aired on the ITV network in the summer of 1996. There was a short hiatus in the third series due to ITV's coverage of the Euro '96 football tournament.

Series 4 (1997)

The fourth series of Wycliffe was originally aired on the ITV network in the summer of 1997.

Series 5 (1997-98)

The final series of Wycliffe was originally aired on the ITV network in the summer of 1998. The Christmas special was originally aired about five months earlier in December 1997.

The fifth and final series saw Jack Shepherd directing two episodes: "On Offer"; and "Standing Stone". During the filming of this series Jimmy Yuill fell ill with meningitis. While he was in hospital the production company, HTV, terminated his contract. Though he made a full recovery HTV then refused to allow him to return to the programme, apparently for insurance reasons. This caused considerable ill-feeling and Jack Shepherd made it clear that he did not wish to continue as Wycliffe. ITV did not recommission the programme.

Notes:
† Christmas Special.

Home media

All five series were released individually on DVD in the UK by Network between 27 July 2009, and 21 February 2011.

All five series were released individually on DVD in Australia through Time Life, distributed by Shock Entertainment. The Complete Collection DVD containing five individual seasons in a slip box was released first, followed later in the same year by a new collection slimmed down to a single case with new artwork. In 2014 ITV released The Complete Collection in a single case.

References

External links
 
 
 
 "Wycliffe on Television" page at www.wjburley.com

1993 British television series debuts
1998 British television series endings
1990s British drama television series
English-language television shows
ITV mystery shows
Television shows based on British novels
Television shows set in Cornwall
Television series by ITV Studios
British detective television series
Television shows produced by Harlech Television (HTV)